Daniel Steel (2 May 1884 – 29 April 1931) was a Scottish professional footballer  who played for clubs including Rangers, Tottenham Hotspur, Third Lanark, Dumbarton and Clapton Orient.

Career
Steel played principally as a centre half, although in his initial appearances for Rangers he played at inside left. Notwithstanding his status as an inexperienced reserve player, the statistical summary of his time at Ibrox ranks among the worst of all those who have played a senior game for the club, with his six appearances including a 5–0 defeat to Partick Thistle in the Glasgow Merchants Charity Cup, and heavy losses to Airdrieonians and Heart of Midlothian (5–0 and 5–1 respectively) in the opening months of the 1905–06 Scottish Division One season.

Steel recovered from this setback, even after spending another two years in the background at Tottenham Hotspur following his move there in 1906, by going on to establish himself and make 141 appearances in all competitions for Spurs (scoring four goals) between 1908 and 1912 before he moved back to Scotland with Third Lanark.

He joined Clapton Orient in December 1914 and featured in 23 matches.

International
While at Tottenham, he was selected for the annual Home Scots v Anglo-Scots trial match on three occasions (1908, 1910 and 1912) but never played for Scotland at full international level.

Personal life
His younger brothers Bobby and Alex were also footballers, with Bobby also having a significant spell at Tottenham Hotspur; the three siblings played together in one Football League fixture against Bradford City in January 1910.

References

1884 births
1931 deaths
Footballers from East Ayrshire
Scottish footballers
Scottish Football League players
English Football League players
Airdrieonians F.C. (1878) players
Rangers F.C. players
Dumbarton F.C. players
Tottenham Hotspur F.C. players
Third Lanark A.C. players
Leyton Orient F.C. players
Association football central defenders
Association football wing halves
Scottish Junior Football Association players